The 2015 Copenhagen Masters was the 23rd edition of the invitational badminton tournament Copenhagen Masters, held in Falconer Salen in Copenhagen.

Results

Men's singles

Women's singles

Men's doubles

Women's doubles

Mixed doubles

External links
 Yonex Copenhagen Masters 2015 at tournamentsoftware.com

Copenhagen Masters
Copenhagen Masters
Copenhagen Masters
Copenhagen Masters